Bruce Richardson Twamley (born 23 May 1952 in Victoria, British Columbia) is a former Canadian international footballer.

Twamley began his professional career with Ipswich Town but after only two appearances in two seasons, he moved back to Canada and played for the Vancouver Whitecaps of the North American Soccer League (NASL) for one season in 1975.  In 1977, he briefly played for the New York Cosmos before being traded to the Minnesota Kicks during the 1977 season.  He began 1978 with Minnesota, but was traded mid-season to the Oakland Stompers.  He finished his NASL career with the Edmonton Drillers in 1979.

Twamley was the head coach of the Canadian U-23 national soccer team.  He served briefly as interim head coach of the national team in 1998.

External links
 / Canada Soccer Hall of Fame

1952 births
Association football defenders
Canada men's international soccer players
Canada men's national soccer team managers
Canadian expatriate sportspeople in the United States
Canadian people of British descent
Canadian soccer coaches
Canadian soccer players
Edmonton Drillers (1979–1982) players
Expatriate footballers in England
Expatriate soccer players in the United States
Ipswich Town F.C. players
Living people
Minnesota Kicks players
North American Soccer League (1968–1984) players
New York Cosmos players
Oakland Stompers players
Soccer players from Victoria, British Columbia
Vancouver Whitecaps (1974–1984) players
Canadian expatriate soccer players
Canadian expatriate sportspeople in England